Baron Mancroft, of Mancroft in the City of Norwich, is a title in the Peerage of the United Kingdom. It was created in 1937 for the Conservative politician Sir Arthur Samuel, 1st Baronet. He had already been created a Baronet, of Mancroft in the City of Norwich in the County of Norfolk, in 1932. His son, the second Baron, was also a Conservative politician. In 1925 he assumed by deed poll the surname of Mancroft.  the titles are held by the latter's only son, the third Baron, who succeeded in 1987. He is one of the ninety elected hereditary peers that remain in the House of Lords after the passing of the House of Lords Act of 1999. Lord Mancroft sits on the Conservative benches.

Barons Mancroft (1937)
Arthur Michael Samuel, 1st Baron Mancroft (1872–1942)
Stormont Mancroft Samuel Mancroft, 2nd Baron Mancroft (1914–1987)
Benjamin Lloyd Stormont Mancroft, 3rd Baron Mancroft (b. 1957)

The heir apparent is the present holder's eldest son Hon. Arthur Louis Stormont Mancroft (b. 1995)

Arms

References

Kidd, Charles, Williamson, David (editors). Debrett's Peerage and Baronetage (1990 edition). New York: St Martin's Press, 1990.

Baronies in the Peerage of the United Kingdom
Noble titles created in 1937
Noble titles created for UK MPs